Franca Squarciapino (born 1940) is an Italian costume designer who won the Academy Award for Best Costume Design in 1990 for Cyrano de Bergerac. She has spent much of her career designing costumes for major theatres and opera houses, including the Burgtheater in Vienna, Royal Opera at Covent Garden, the Metropolitan Opera, the Vienna State Opera, and Zurich Opera among others.

Squarciapino frequently collaborated with Ezio Frigerio (1930-2022), who was also her life partner.

References

External links

Italian costume designers
Women costume designers
Best Costume Design Academy Award winners
Best Costume Design BAFTA Award winners
Opera designers
Living people
1940 births
People from Rome